The Matilda Way is an Australian road route from Bourke, New South Wales to Karumba in Queensland. It has been designated by the Queensland Government as a State Strategic Touring Route.

The route
The New South Wales section is from Bourke to Barringun, on the Queensland side of the state border, via the Mitchell Highway.
The route in Queensland is via the Mitchell Highway to Augathella, and then as follows:
 Landsborough Highway from Augathella to Cloncurry
 Burke Developmental Road from Cloncurry to Howitt (Walker Creek Rest Stop)
 Karumba Road from Howitt to Karumba

Outback Queensland website
The tourism organisation "Outback Queensland" has established a website titled "Matilda Way" that provides some information about each of the following segments: 
 Barringun to Cunnamulla (intersection with Balonne Highway (Adventure Way))
 Cunnamulla to Charleville (intersections with Warrego Highway and Diamantina Developmental Road (Warrego Way))
 Charleville to Blackall
 Blackall to Barcaldine (intersection with Capricorn Highway (Capricorn Way))
 Barcaldine to Longreach
 Longreach to Winton
 Winton to Kynuna
 Kynuna to McKinlay to Cloncurry (intersections with Flinders Highway and Barkly Highway (Overlanders Way))
 Cloncurry to Normanton (intersections with Gulf Developmental Road and Burketown Normanton Road (Savannah Way))
 Normanton to Karumba

References 

State Strategic Touring Routes in Queensland